Idris Ingilabli (born on 6 October 2001) is an Azerbaijani professional footballer who plays as a midfielder for Kapaz, on loan from Sabah, in the Azerbaijan Premier League.

Club career
On 25 August 2019, Ingilabli made his debut in the Azerbaijan Premier League for Gabala match against Qarabağ.

On 4 June 2020, Ingilabli signed a four-years contract with Sabah FC.

On 3 January 2023, Ingilabli joined Kapaz on loan for the remainder of the season.

References

External links
 

2001 births
Living people
Association football midfielders
Azerbaijani footballers
Azerbaijan youth international footballers
Azerbaijan Premier League players
Gabala FC players
Sabah FC (Azerbaijan) players